Wangla is a Market Center in Sandhikharka Municipality of Arghakhanchi District in the Lumbini Zone of southern Nepal. The former village development committee (VDC) was converted into a municipality on 18 May 2014 by merging the existing Sandhikharka, Wangla, Narapani, Khanchikot, Keemadada, Argha and Dibharna VDCs. At the time of the 1991 Nepal census, the town had a population of 5,142 living in 1,033 houses. At the time of the 2001 Nepal census, the population was 5,380, of which 66% was literate.

References

Populated places in Arghakhanchi District